Lempel–Ziv–Oberhumer (LZO) is a lossless data compression algorithm that is focused on decompression speed.

Design 
The original "lzop" implementation, released in 1996, was developed by Markus Franz Xaver Johannes Oberhumer, based on earlier algorithms by Abraham Lempel and Jacob Ziv. The LZO library implements a number of algorithms with the following characteristics:
 Higher compression speed compared to DEFLATE compression
 Very fast decompression
 Requires an additional buffer during compression (of size 8 kB or 64 kB, depending on compression level)
 Requires no additional memory for decompression other than the source and destination buffers
 Allows the user to adjust the balance between compression ratio and compression speed, without affecting the speed of decompression

LZO supports overlapping compression and in-place decompression. As a block compression algorithm, it compresses and decompresses blocks of data. Block size must be the same for compression and decompression. LZO compresses a block of data into matches (a sliding dictionary) and runs of non-matching literals to produce good results on highly redundant data and deals acceptably with non-compressible data, only expanding incompressible data by a maximum of 1/64 of the original size when measured over a block size of at least 1 kB.

Implementations 
The reference implementation is written in ANSI C, and it has been made available as free software under the GNU General Public License. The copyright for the code is owned by Markus F. X. J. Oberhumer. It was originally published in 1996. Oberhumer has also written a command-line frontend called lzop.

Versions of LZO are available for the Perl, Python and Java languages. Various LZO implementations are reported to work under Win32, AIX, ConvexOS, IRIX, Mac OS, Palm OS, PlayStation, Nintendo 64, Wii, Solaris, SunOS, TOS (Atari ST), Linux and VxWorks.

FFmpeg's libavutil library includes its own implementation of LZO as a possible method for lossless video compression. FFmpeg's implementation of the decompressor is also used in OpenConnect in order to support LZO-compressed ESP packets sent by Juniper Networks and Pulse Secure VPN servers.

The Linux kernel uses its LZO implementation in some of its features:

btrfs uses LZO as a possible compression method for file system compression.
initrd and initramfs use LZO as a possible compression method for initial RAM drive compression.
SquashFS uses LZO as a possible compression method for file system compression.
zram uses LZO with run-length encoding called LZO-RLE as the default compression method for RAM drive compression.
zswap uses LZO as the default compression method for virtual memory compression

References

External links 
 
  - Pure Java implementation of the liblzo2 LZO compression algorithm

Lossless compression algorithms
Free data compression software
C (programming language) libraries